Oroxindin is a flavone, a type of phenolic chemical compound. It is a wogonoside, more accurately a wogonin glucuronide isolated from Oroxylum indicum (Bignoniaceae), Bacopa monnieri (Plantaginaceae) and Holmskioldia sanguinea (Chinese hat plant, Verbenaceae).

References

External links 
 Oroxindin at nextbio.com

Flavone glycosides
Flavonoid glucuronides
Glucuronide esters